Terminal Bar: A Photographic Record of New York's Most Notorious Watering Hole is a 2014 photography book that is a collection of Sheldon Nadelman's photos taken during his ten years spent as a bartender at the Terminal Bar in New York City.

The book was published in 2014 by Princeton Architectural Press.

The book's photos were the subject of a 2002 American documentary short film, Terminal Bar, directed by Sheldon Nadelman's son, Stefan Nadelman that used a combination of animation, live action and black-and-white photography of Terminal Bar's former patrons taken by Sheldon Nadelman, from 1972 to 1982.

References

External links

American non-fiction books
English-language books
Debut books
2014 non-fiction books
Books about photography
Books of photographs